The 1967 All-Ireland Minor Football Championship was the 36th staging of the All-Ireland Minor Football Championship, the Gaelic Athletic Association's premier inter-county Gaelic football tournament for boys under the age of 18.

Mayo entered the championship as defending champions, however, they were defeated by Roscommon in the Connacht final.

On 24 September 1967, Cork won the championship following a 5-14 to 2-3 defeat of Laois in the All-Ireland final. This was their second All-Ireland title overall and their first in six championship seasons.

Connacht Minor Football Championship

Connacht quarter-final

Connacht semi-finals

Connacht final

Leinster Minor Football Championship

Leinster preliminary round

Leinster first round

Leinster quarter-finals

Leinster semi-finals

Leinster final

Munster Minor Football Championship

Munster quarter-finals

Munster semi-finals

Munster final

Ulster Minor Football Championship

Ulster final

All-Ireland Minor Football Championship

All-Ireland semi-finals

All-Ireland final

Championship statistics

Miscellaneous

 Cork achieve the double for the first time in their history, after earlier winning the All-Ireland Minor Hurling Championship. Teddy O'Brien, Jimmy Barrett and Simon Murphy claim winners' medals in both All-Ireland victories.

References

1967
All-Ireland Minor Football Championship